Boundary line may refer to:

 Border, geographic boundaries of political entities or legal jurisdictions
 Maritime boundary
 An episode of Planetes, see list of Planetes episodes
 Boundary line (sports), the edges of a field

See also
 Boundary (disambiguation)